Saint-Quentin-sur-Sauxillanges (literally Saint Quentin on Sauxillanges) is a commune in the Puy-de-Dôme department in Auvergne in central France.

See also
Communes of the Puy-de-Dôme department

References

Saintquentinsursauxillanges